Toivo Oikarinen (16 April 1924 – 4 May 2003) was a Finnish cross-country skier who competed in the 1950s. He finished tenth in the 18 km event at the 1952 Winter Olympics in Oslo. He was born in Sonkajärvi.

Cross-country skiing results

Olympic Games

References

External links
18 km Olympic cross country results: 1948-52

1924 births
2003 deaths
People from Sonkajärvi
Olympic cross-country skiers of Finland
Cross-country skiers at the 1952 Winter Olympics
Finnish male cross-country skiers
Sportspeople from North Savo
20th-century Finnish people